Tandem Productions, Inc. (a.k.a. Tandem Enterprises, Inc.) was a film and television production company that was founded in 1958 by television director Bud Yorkin and television writer/producer Norman Lear.

History

Tandem Productions
In the early years, Yorkin and Lear initially established Tandem specifically for television production. The name was chosen because when launching their company, Yorkin and Lear were said to feel like two men riding uphill on a tandem bicycle. The company produced several variety and dramatic television specials such as the Fred Astaire specials, Henry Fonda and the Family, An Evening with Carol Channing and The Scene '66, to name a few.  Tandem was also at hand for various unsold pilots throughout the 1950s and 1960s, including Henry T., Meet Me at Danny's and Barnaby (not to be confused with Barnaby Jones). 
The company also financed the production of theatrical films, some of which were released by Warner Bros. Pictures, Paramount Pictures, Columbia Pictures, and United Artists.

Lear and Yorkin later turned their focus on situation comedy.  The first success in that genre was All in the Family, which was based on the British sitcom Till Death Us Do Part.  Before the series made its debut on January 12, 1971, Yorkin and Lear shot two unsold pilots for the series: one in 1968 called Justice For All and the other in 1969 titled Those Were the Days. Production for the series began in late 1970, following the third pilot episode which was picked up by CBS.  More successful shows were also produced by Tandem; they were Maude (1972–1978), Good Times (1974–1979), and finally Sanford and Son (1972–1977). In 1977, Viacom Enterprises secured domestic and international television syndication rights for All in the Family which hit off-network reruns in Fall 1979.  Columbia Pictures Television took over distribution for the series by 1991.

In 1978, Tandem produced Diff'rent Strokes, which was the first show not to be produced by Yorkin nor Lear.  Archie Bunker's Place was produced in 1979, Sanford in 1980 and Gloria, the final series to be produced by Tandem in 1982. Not many more shows were produced under the Tandem name, but many other shows were being produced under T.A.T. Communications Company during the early 1980s. Also in 1978, Tandem Productions launched P*I*T*S Films (an acronym which stands for "Pie In The Sky") as its television distribution arm for its parent company's programs (All in the Family was excluded, which at the time was distributed by Viacom).  P*I*T*S Films was reincorporated as Embassy Telecommunications in 1982.

Bud Yorkin Productions and TOY Productions
After Yorkin ended his partnership with Lear in 1975, he collaborated with writers and producers Saul Turteltaub and Bernie Orenstein (who wrote some episodes and produced Sanford and Son from 1974 to 1977) and established Bud Yorkin Productions, Inc. He still remained as the executive producer of the series.

The first sitcom was Grady, a Sanford and Son spin-off starring Whitman Mayo. The series was canceled after twelve episodes due to low ratings.

In 1976, Yorkin, Turteltaub, and Orenstein established TOY Productions, and the first sitcom for the new company was ABC's What's Happening!!. The series was suggested by the American International Picture Cooley High, written by Eric Monte.

On February 19, 1979, TOY was acquired by Columbia Pictures Television and launched a new series, 13 Queens Boulevard. A year later, they co-produced the short-lived sitcom One in a Million, starring Shirley Hemphill.

Two years later, TOY produced another sitcom, One of the Boys. It received negative reception, and after it was cancelled on April 24, 1982, TOY was folded.

Despite forming his own production company, Yorkin stayed on board with Tandem as executive vice president.

1980s
After Norman Lear bought Avco Embassy Pictures, he dropped the name "Avco" and reincorporated T.A.T. Communications as Embassy Television. All series that were still produced by T.A.T. (such as The Facts of Life, The Jeffersons, and One Day at a Time) were produced under the Embassy name.  All shows by Tandem Productions that were off the air were distributed by Embassy Telecommunications.

In 1983, Ken Stump, the former associate producer for Tandem Productions and T.A.T. Communications was made in charge of production for Tandem Productions and Embassy Television. The same year in June, Lear and Perenchio bought out Yorkin's interest in Tandem.

On June 18, 1985, Norman Lear and Jerry Perenchio sold Embassy Communications, Inc. to The Coca-Cola Company for $485 million, but then Coke sold Embassy Pictures to Dino De Laurentiis since De Laurentiis didn't want to release his movies through a major studio anymore. Coke's plan was to keep the television division and to spin-off the other labels that weren't part of the deal.

De Laurentiis later folded Embassy Pictures with the formation of De Laurentiis Entertainment Group. The majority of the motion picture holdings are currently licensed to Metro-Goldwyn-Mayer and StudioCanal. However, Columbia Pictures still retains Crimewave and Saving Grace (both co-distributed by Embassy Pictures). SPE also has the television rights to the Avco Embassy Film The Fog (1980) since a 2005 remake.

After the sale of Embassy, CPT also produced and distributed the sitcom What's Happening Now!! which was co-produced by LBS Communications. The same year, Diff'rent Strokes moved to ABC from NBC after NBC cancelled the series. Tandem Productions remained active, but Coke and Embassy Communications launched Tandem Licensing Corporation as Tandem's licensing division.

In 1986, Diff'rent Strokes was canceled due to low ratings and Tandem Productions was abandoned. Embassy Television, Embassy Telecommunications and Tandem Productions were merged with Embassy Communications and Embassy Communications became a full television studio than a holding company (later becoming part of Columbia/Embassy Television in November 1986). However, Tandem still remained as an in-name-only division of Embassy Communications until January 2, 1988 when it became in-name-only to Columbia Pictures Television and in turn an in-name-only sub-division of ELP Communications. The same year, Coca-Cola spun off and sold Embassy Home Entertainment to Nelson Holdings, Inc. and became Nelson Entertainment.

CPT still retained the television rights to those Embassy movies by Joseph E. Levine, Avco Embassy Pictures, and Lear/Perenchio's Embassy Pictures.

Notable TV Programs/Studios and tapings by Tandem Productions

All in the Family at CBS Television City (1971–1975) and Metromedia Square (1975–1979)
Maude at CBS Television City (1972–1975) and Metromedia Square (1975–1978)
Sanford and Son at NBC Studios in Burbank (1972–1977)
Good Times at CBS Television City (1974–1975) and Metromedia Square (1975–1979)
Sanford Arms at NBC Studios in Burbank (1977)
Diff'rent Strokes at Metromedia Square (1978–1982), Universal Studios By Compact Video (1982–1985) and ABC Television Center (1985–1986)
Archie Bunker's Place at CBS Television City (1979–1983)
Sanford at Metromedia Square (1980–1981)
Gloria at Universal Studios by Compact Video (1982–1983, originally slated to be an Embassy Television Production)

TOY Productions
 Grady (1975–1976)
 What's Happening!! (1976–1979)
 Carter Country (1977–1979)
 13 Queens Boulevard (1979)
 One in a Million (1980)
 One of the Boys (1982)

Theatrical movies

Come Blow Your Horn (1963, distributed by Paramount Pictures); (Essex-Tandem)
Never Too Late (1965, distributed by Warner Bros. Pictures);
Divorce American Style  (1967, as Tandem Enterprises, Inc. and distributed by Columbia Pictures);
The Night They Raided Minsky's (1968, distributed by United Artists);
Start the Revolution Without Me (1970, as Norbud Productions and distributed by Warner Bros. Pictures);
Cold Turkey (1971, distributed by United Artists);
 The Thief Who Came to Dinner (1973, distributed by Warner Bros. Pictures)

Notable actors and actresses

Tandem, TOY, and ELP Communications used the same actors and actresses to appear on different television programs.

John Amos (Tandem)
Marla Gibbs (ELP)
Esther Rolle (Tandem)
Demond Wilson (Tandem)
Carroll O'Connor (Tandem)	
Ernest Lee Thomas (TOY)
Todd Bridges (Tandem, TOY, ELP) 
LaWanda Page (Tandem, ELP)
Kim Fields (Tandem, ELP)
Gary Coleman (Tandem, ELP)
Charlotte Rae (Tandem, ELP)	
Nathaniel Taylor Jr. (Tandem, TOY)
Whitman Mayo (Tandem, ELP)
Hal Williams (Tandem, TOY, ELP) 
Helen Martin (Tandem, TOY, ELP)
Isabel Sanford (Tandem, ELP)
Sherman Hemsley (Tandem, ELP) 
Michael Evans (Tandem, ELP)
Jean Stapleton (Tandem, ELP)  
Sally Struthers (Tandem)
Theodore Wilson (Tandem, TOY, ELP)

References

Sony Pictures Television
Sony Pictures Entertainment
Predecessors of Sony Pictures Television
American companies established in 1958
Norman Lear
Television production companies of the United States